Myrtle May Simpson (1905–1981) was a notable New Zealand teacher, school inspector and educationalist. She was born in Christchurch, New Zealand in 1905. Simpson completed her master's degree at Canterbury University College (now the University of Canterbury) in 1935, with a thesis on the history of the New Zealand Parliament between 1856 and 1860.

References

1905 births
1981 deaths
New Zealand schoolteachers
People from Christchurch
People educated at Christchurch Girls' High School